Haryanvi films are films in the Haryanvi dialect of Hindi. Due to the dominance of the Mumbai-based Hindi film industry, films in Haryanvi were not extensively produced until the 1980s. The First movie of Haryanvi cinema is Dharti, released in 1968. The financial success of Devi Shankar Prabhakar's Chandrawal (1984) was largely responsible for the continuing production of Haryanvi films, although none have been as successful. Other films such as Phool Badan and Chora Haryane Ka followed with only about one out of twelve films being profitable at the box office.
In 2000, Aswini Chowdhary won the Indira Gandhi Award for Best Debut Film of a Director at the National Film Awards for the Haryanvi film Laddo. In 2010 the government of Haryana announced they were considering establishing a film board to promote Haryanvi-language films. At the 62nd National Film Awards, the Haryanvi movie Pagdi The Honour won the award for Best Feature Film in Haryanvi and Baljinder Kaur won the National Film Award for Best Supporting Actress for her role in the same.

In the 63rd National Film Awards, Satrangi, directed by Sundeep Sharma, won the Best Feature Film in Haryanvi and also won six awards in the Haryana International Film Festival, Hissar in 2017. Yashpal Sharma won the best actor award for Satrangi in the JIFF (Jharkhand International Film Festival), 2018.

Haryanvi Films

See also
 State Institute of Film and Television 
 Saang
 Haryanvi cinema
 Haryanvi language
 Haryanvi music
 Indian musical instruments
 List of Indian folk dances
 Bollywood

References

External links
 haryanvimusic.com
 raagani.com
 haryanviimage.com

Film
Lists of Indian films
 
Haryanvi